Holy Trinity Cathedral is a Greek Orthodox cathedral in Charlotte, North Carolina The Cathedral is the only Eastern Orthodox Cathedral in the state of North Carolina, and the mother church of Greek Orthodoxy in North Carolina. Holy Trinity Cathedral is within the jurisdiction of the Greek Orthodox Archdiocese of America led by Elpidophoros of America and the Greek Orthodox Diocese of Atlanta, led by Alexios of Atlanta. The cathedral was built in 1954. 

Every year the YiaSou Greek Festival takes place in early September in the area surrounding the Cathedral, and it is considered to be one of the busiest festivals in the State.

References

Churches in Charlotte, North Carolina
Eastern Orthodox churches in North Carolina
Greek Orthodox cathedrals in the United States
20th-century Eastern Orthodox church buildings
Church buildings with domes
Greek festivals
Cathedrals in North Carolina